Fan of a Fan is the first collaborative mixtape by American recording artists Chris Brown and Tyga. It was released on May 16, 2010.

Background 
In an interview with MTV, Tyga said: "Me and Chris, basically, we met a couple of years ago, we had mutual friends. I always seen him come in the studio when he was with Wayne. It's crazy, because I never asked him for a track. I never wanted to press up on him like that. One day, he hit me up. He was like, 'Yo, man, let's do some songs.' So I came to the studio. The first two songs [you saw videos for], 'Holla at Me' and 'All the Girls Love,' them two songs was like the first time we ever recorded. When we recorded them songs, he was like, 'Let's do a mixtape.' It's crazy, ’cause the mixtape, we did in a whole week. I flew out to VA, and we knocked out the whole mixtape."

Track listing

References

2010 albums
Debut mixtape albums
Chris Brown albums
Tyga albums
2010 mixtape albums